Viktor Alekseyevich Krovopuskov (born 29 September 1948 in Moscow) is a retired sabre fencer, who competed for the USSR.

Krovopuskov began fencing at age 13 at the Children and Youth Sport School in Moscow, his first trainer being Igor Chernyshev. In 1967 he joined the Armed Forces sports society in Moscow. He was a member of the USSR National Team between 1973 and 1986. At the 1976 Olympics he won gold medals in both the individual and team sabre events. He repeated his performance at the 1980 Summer Olympics, where he again won gold medals in both events.

Krovopuskov was world champion in individual sabre twice (1978 and 1982), and team sabre five times (1974, 1975, 1979, 1983, and 1985). He also won the World Cup in sabre twice (1976 and 1979). In 1979 he was named the Best Sabre Fencer of the World by the International Fencing Federation.

He was awarded the Order of the Red Banner of Labour in 1976 and the Order of Lenin in 1980.

Bibliography

References

External links
  Biography and photo

1948 births
Living people
Martial artists from Moscow
Olympic fencers of the Soviet Union
Fencers at the 1976 Summer Olympics
Fencers at the 1980 Summer Olympics
Olympic gold medalists for the Soviet Union
Olympic medalists in fencing
Medalists at the 1976 Summer Olympics
Medalists at the 1980 Summer Olympics
Honoured Masters of Sport of the USSR
Recipients of the Order of Lenin
Recipients of the Order of the Red Banner of Labour
Russian male fencers
Soviet male fencers